Harris Lake is located just outside Downtown Highlands, North Carolina.  It is a popular spot for fishing and picnicking.  Harris Lake is home to many geese, swans and ducks.

The town of Highlands operates Harris Lake Park.

External links
 Harris Lake Park - Highlands, North Carolina

Reservoirs in North Carolina
Bodies of water of Macon County, North Carolina